Arif-ur-Rehman Alvi  (born 29 July 1949) is a politician currently serving as the 13th President of Pakistan, in office since 9 September 2018. He was a member of the National Assembly of Pakistan from June 2013 to May 2018 and again from August to September 2018. A founding member of Pakistan Tehreek-i-Insaf (PTI), Alvi was elected as President of Pakistan on 4 September 2018 following the presidential elections.

Alvi was a dentist before entering politics in 1979, when he joined Jamaat-e-Islami but he later on resigned from the party and founded the Pakistan Tehreek-e-Insaf with former Pakistan cricket team captain and  cricketer-turned-politician, Imran Khan in 1996.

Alvi was elected to the National Assembly, from a seat of Karachi in 2013 and was re-elected in 2018 and was nominated as a candidate for the presidential election. He was elected as the 13th President of Pakistan after defeating Fazal-ur-Rehman and Aitzaz Ahsan, after which he resigned from the National Assembly and was sworn into office on 9 September 2018, succeeding Mamnoon Hussain.

Personal life and education

Alvi was born on 29 July 1949 in Karachi, Pakistan. 

His father, Habib-ur-Rehman Elahi Alvi, was a dentist in British India who migrated to Karachi after the establishment of Pakistan, and opened a dental clinic in Saddar Town. His father became politically affiliated with Jamaat-e-Islami Pakistan. According to the website of Pakistan Tehreek-e-Insaf, Alvi's father was a dentist of Jawaharlal Nehru.

After his father started a campaign against compulsory Bible classes, he was expelled from Karachi Grammar School. He completed his early education in Karachi, and moved to Lahore in 1967 for education in dentistry. Alvi received a Bachelor of Dental Surgery degree from De'Montmorency College of Dentistry. He completed his master's degree in prosthodontics from the University of Michigan in 1975. Alvi received a master's degree in orthodontics in 1984 from the University of the Pacific in San Francisco, California. After returning to Pakistan, he started practicing dentistry and set up Alvi Dental Hospital.

Alvi is married to Samina Alvi. The couple has four married children.

In March 2021, he tested positive for COVID-19 shortly after having received the first dose of a vaccine, which was later confirmed to have been a vaccine from Sinopharm. In January 2022, he contracted Covid-19 again amidst the Omicron wave.

Professional career

In 1981, Alvi was Chairman of the first Pakistan International Dental Conference. In 1987, he became Chairman of the Third Pakistan International Dental Conference. He became Patron of the Fifth Pakistan International Dental Conference. In 1997, Alvi became a Diplomate of the American Board of Orthodontics. He prepared the constitution of the Pakistan Dental Association and went on to become its president. He also served as Chairman of the 28th Asia Pacific Dental Congress.

He served as Dean of the Faculty of Orthodontics of the College of Physicians and Surgeons Pakistan. In 2006, he was elected as the President of Asia Pacific Dental Federation. The next year, he was elected as a Councillor of the FDI World Dental Federation.

Political career

Alvi began his political career as a polling agent, and joined a religious party.

While studying at De'Montmorency College of Dentistry, he became an active member of the student unions. He became politically affiliated with Islami Jamiat Talaba, a student wing of Jamaat-e-Islami Pakistan (JI) and went on to become president of the student union. During his early days, he was a critic of the Ayub Khan regime and was shot twice while participating in a protest in 1969 at The Mall, Lahore; a bullet still remains lodged in his body.

He became politically active after Zulfikar Ali Bhutto announced the 1977 Pakistani general election.

He ran for a seat on the Provincial Assembly of Sindh as a candidate of the JI from a constituency in Karachi in 1979 but was unsuccessful. In 1988, he quit JI and left politics. According to Alvi, he left the party because he had become disillusioned with their narrow focus on politics and had "always felt honest leadership is the real solution to Pakistan’s problems".

After getting inspired by Imran Khan, he joined Pakistan Tehreek-e-Insaf in 1996 and became one of the founding members of the party. He participated in preparing the party constitution of PTI.

He remained a member of the PTI central executive council for a year before becoming president of PTI's Sindh chapter in 1997.

Alvi ran for the seat of the Provincial Assembly of Sindh as a candidate of PTI from Constituency PS-89 (Karachi South-V) in the 1997 Pakistani general election, but was unsuccessful. He came in third receiving 2,200 votes and lost the seat to Saleem Zia.

In 2001, he became the vice president of PTI.

He ran for the seat of the Provincial Assembly of Sindh as a candidate of PTI from Constituency PS-90 (Karachi-II) in the 2002 Pakistani general election, but was unsuccessful. He came in at sixth place securing 1,276 votes and lost the seat to Umer Sadiq, a candidate of the Muttahida Majlis-e-Amal (MMA).

In 2006, he became secretary general of PTI, a position he served in until 2013.

He was elected to the National Assembly of Pakistan as a candidate of PTI from Constituency NA-250 (Karachi-XII) in the 2013 Pakistani general election. He received 77,659 votes and defeated Khushbakht Shujaat. Upon his successful election, he became the only PTI member to win a National Assembly seat from Sindh in the 2013 general elections.

In 2016, he was made president of the PTI Sindh chapter.

He was re-elected to the National Assembly as a candidate of PTI from Constituency NA-247 (Karachi South-II) in the 2018 Pakistani general election. He received 91,020 votes and defeated Syed Zaman Ali Jaffery, a candidate of Tehreek-e-Labbaik Pakistan.

On 18 August 2018, he was nominated by PTI as its candidate for the office of President of Pakistan. On 4 September 2018, he was elected as 13th President of Pakistan in the 2018 Pakistani presidential election. He received 352 electoral votes and defeated Fazal-ur-Rehman and Aitzaz Ahsan who secured 184 and 124 votes, respectively. Upon getting elected as the President, Alvi thanked Prime Minister Imran Khan, and the government coalition for their support. He is the third President of Pakistan whose family migrated to Pakistan from India after the Partition of India. On 5 September 2018, he relinquished his National Assembly seat. On 9 September, he replaced Mamnoon Hussain and was sworn in as 13th President of Pakistan. On 17 September, he addressed the National Assembly for the first time in his capacity as president.

On 3 April 2022, he dissolved the National Assembly of Pakistan on the advice of Prime Minister Imran Khan, in order to prevent the moving of the scheduled no-confidence motion that intended to remove Khan from the office of PM. The dissolution was appealed to the Supreme Court of Pakistan, which declared the move as unconstitutional and restored the National Assembly on 7 April, which then proceeded to carry out the no-confidence motion on the night of 9 April. The motion was successful after 174 MNAs voted in its favour (172 were needed), thus ending Imran Khan's term as Prime Minister.

Presidential initiatives 
In 2018, he started the Presidential Initiative for Artificial Intelligence and Computing (PIAIC).

The privately funded not-for-profit educational initiative is launched to help promote education, research and business opportunities in Artificial Intelligence, Blockchain, and Cloud Native computing and Internet of Things. He believes that the world is on the verge of the Fourth Industrial Revolution (4IR) that would change the overall outlook of the industrial working.

The initiative is being run with the help of public-private partnerships with non-profit and for-profit organizations.

The program has an initial target to enroll as many as 100,000 students within a year.

The program has been launched in the city of Karachi where as many as 12,000 students are enrolled in the 4 disciplines being offered and registration is underway to offer it in Islamabad, and Faisalabad. The program is expected to expand to Lahore, Peshawar, and Quetta in the near future.

Women's Inclusion in Technology 

One of the most important goals of the PIAIC was to provide a conduit for women to seek and find quality and affordable high tech training in most cities of Pakistan.  This has resulted in the creation of "Women's Inclusion in Technology", a women's empowerment division in the PIAIC.  The division is led by Hira Khan, who is also the COO of Panacloud (Pvt.), Ltd. and a well-seasoned IT trainer and software engineer. She has championed women's empowerment and especially their economic empowerment in Pakistan.

First visit to a Federal Ministry

Alvi's first ever visit to a federal ministry as president was in June 2020 when he visited the headquarters of the Ministry of Maritime Affairs. Alvi launched the Ministry's official website on the occasion of World Oceans Day and was briefed by Maritime Minister Ali Haider Zaidi and Federal Secretary Rizwan Ahmed about the ministry's role and achievements.

References

1949 births
Living people
Pakistani Muslims
Jamaat-e-Islami Pakistan politicians
Muhajir people
Hashemite people
Alvis
Orthodontists
Pakistani expatriates in the United States
Pakistani dentists
Pakistani MNAs 2013–2018
Pakistani people of Arab descent
Pakistani MNAs 2018–2023
Pakistan Tehreek-e-Insaf MNAs
Politicians from Karachi
Presidents of Pakistan
University of Michigan School of Dentistry alumni
University of the Pacific (United States) alumni